Peter Stampfel (born October 29, 1938, in Wauwatosa, Wisconsin) is an American fiddle player, old-time musician, and singer-songwriter.

Stampfel is best known as a member of the Holy Modal Rounders, a psychedelic folk band that he founded with Steve Weber in the early 1960s. He was also briefly a member of the Fugs and has been the leader of several musical projects, including the Bottlecaps, the Du-Tels, and the WORM All-Stars. He has performed with They Might Be Giants, the Roches, Richard Barone, Yo La Tengo, Bongwater, Jeffrey Lewis, Michael Hurley, Baby Gramps and Loudon Wainwright III.

Discography 

Solo
 May 1994 Hello CD of the Month (1994)
 You Must Remember This... (1995)
 Dook of the Beatniks (2010)
 Better Than Expected (2014)
 Holiday For Strings (2016)
 The Cambrian Explosion (2017)
 The Ordovician Era (2019)
 Peter Stampfel's 20th Century in 100 Songs (2021)

The Fugs
 Virgin Fugs (1966) 
Holy Modal Rounders
 The Holy Modal Rounders (1964)
 The Holy Modal Rounders 2 (1965)
 Indian War Whoop (1967)
 The Moray Eels Eat The Holy Modal Rounders (1968)
 Good Taste Is Timeless (1971)
 Alleged in Their Own Time (1975)
 Last Round (1978)
 Going Nowhere Fast (1981)
 Too Much Fun! (1999)

with the Bottlecaps
 Peter Stampfel & the Bottlecaps (1986)
 People's Republic of Rock 'n' Roll (1989)
 The Jig Is Up (2004)

with Zoë Stampfel
 Ass in the Air (2010)

with Baby Gramps
 Outertainment (2010)

with Jeffrey Lewis
 Come On Board (2011)
 Hey Hey, it's... The Jeffrey Lewis & Peter Stampfel Band (2013)
 Have Moicy 2: The Hoodoo Bash (2015)
 Both Ways (2021)

with Luke Faust
 Wendigo Dwain Story (2011)

with the Unholy Modal Rounders and others
 Have Moicy! (1976)

with the WORM All-Stars
 A Sure Sign of Something (2011)

 References 

External links
Interview on Stampfel's folk beginnings, New York City in the 1950s and collaborations, with Jersey Beat''

1938 births
American folk musicians
American folk rock musicians
American folk singers
American male singers
American violinists
American male violinists
Singers from Wisconsin
Musicians from Milwaukee
Songwriters from Wisconsin
Living people
The Fugs members
American book editors
Science fiction editors
21st-century violinists
The Holy Modal Rounders members
Don Giovanni Records artists
Homestead Records artists